Fuji Bikes is a brand of bicycles and cycling equipment currently owned by Advanced Sports International. The company took its name and logo from Mount Fuji, a Japanese symbol of strength and endurance.

History

The company was founded in 1899 in Japan by Okazaki Kyūjirō. In 1900 it was established under the trade name Nichibei Shōkai (literally 'Japanese-American Trading Company'). At first, it was importing and distributing US-products, but later it began bicycle production in Japan. During World War II the company name was changed to Dainippon Cycle, which after the war was changed back to Nichibei Fuji Cycle Company. By the late 1920s, Fuji was Japan’s most popular bicycle. In the 1930s, Fuji established the first national stage race between Osaka and Tokyo and sponsored the winning team.  Today, this race remains a premier race in Asia. The first Asian games were held in New Delhi in 1951. Shoichiro Sugihara, riding a Fuji, won the first race.

In the 1950s, Toshoku America acquired distribution rights to Fuji-made bicycles in the United States. Toshoku America sold private-label Fuji-made bicycles as house brands through U.S. retailers such as Sears & Roebuck and Montgomery Wards.

During this period, Fuji became a partner with several contractors supplying parts for Japanese bicycles, including Sugino Cycle Industries and SunTour. Sales expanded into other Asian markets. At the 1964 Tokyo Olympics, Fuji's chief engineer and designer, Dr Shoichiro Sugihara, designed the Japanese national team bicycles and was team coach. He repeated this role at the 1968 Olympics in Mexico and the 1972 Olympics in Munich, Germany.

By 1971, Fuji America was established to distribute models across the United States. Fuji played a part in the cycling boom of the 1970s.  It introduced the first successful mass-production 12-speed bicycle in the mid-1970s, using a redesigned rear axle to minimize spoke dish to maintain wheel strength.  In 1974, Richard Ballantine, author of Richard's Bicycle Book, recommended Fuji road bicycles at or near the top of each of four price and quality categories, from basic (low-price) to professional (high-end).

During the early 1980s, Fuji developed touring bicycles, and in 1986 was one of the first to manufacture frames of titanium. Fuji was not well situated to take advantage of the mountain bike boom of the 1980s. The demand for mountain bikes caused a steep decline in touring and road bike sales. This allowed manufacturers such as Specialized, Giant, and Trek to make inroads into Fuji's share of U.S. bicycle sales, often using frames produced at lower cost in Taiwan.

With the continued rise of the yen, Fuji fell on hard times in the early 1990s. One of the last Japanese bike companies to shift production to Taiwan after the fall of the dollar, Fuji bicycles cost more in the United States than most competing brands, causing a drop in sales.  Fuji bicycles produced in Taiwan were not as well regarded by U.S. buyers as the Japanese-built bicycles.  The company eventually designed new models, taking advantage of modern improvements in materials and construction techniques, but this proved insufficient. Toshoku America filed for bankruptcy in 1997, and in 1998, Nichibei Fuji Cycle Company Ltd., Fuji America's parent company, also declared bankruptcy.

Following bankruptcy, bicycle distribution in the United States was taken over by Advanced Sports. In 1998, Jadeland Pacific, an investment group in Taiwan, acquired 100% of Advanced Sports, which had purchased the assets of Fuji America as well as the worldwide distribution rights to the Fuji bicycle brand.

In 2004, Ideal Bike Corporation, Taiwan's third-largest complete-bicycle maker, acquired 17% of Advanced Sports International Asia, which markets the Fuji brand of bicycles in Asia. Fuji bicycles are now built in Taichung, Taiwan; Dong Guan, Guangdong Province, China; and in Kutno, Poland by Ideal Bike Corporation.

In the United States, the Fuji brand is owned and distributed by Advanced Sports International (ASI), a privately held corporation located in Philadelphia, Pennsylvania.

In November 2018 ASE (the parent company of ASI and Performance Bicycle) declared bankruptcy, leaving the fate of US distribution of Fuji bicycles uncertain. 

It was reported on January 17, 2019 that HEAD was buying the assets of ASE (the parent company of Fuji) out of bankruptcy.  On January 22, 2019 it was reported that Head Sports backed out of the deal to buy ASE.  On February 1, 2019 it was reported that the Tiger Group won the auction for ASE.

Sponsored teams and riders
Currently Fuji sponsors the UCI Continental Circuits Caja Rural-Seguros Cycling Team. Previously, until the end of 2014, Fuji sponsored and equipped the UCI Continental Circuits NetApp Endura, which rode the Fuji Altamira Road Bike and Fuji D-6 1.0 Time Trial bike. Riders of NetApp Endura also worked with the Fuji design team in the development of the Fuji Transonic Aero Road Bike. Fuji also sponsors U.S. triathlete Matt Reed.

See also

 List of BMX bicycle manufacturers
 List of companies of Taiwan

References

External links

Bicycle Culture Center, Japan 
Classic Fuji BMX bicycle reference
Ideal Bike Corporation
Ideal Europe
Advanced Sports International (ASI)

Cycle manufacturers of Japan
Cycle manufacturers of Taiwan
Cycle manufacturers of the United States
Mountain bike manufacturers
Vehicle manufacturing companies established in 1899
Japanese companies established in 1899
Defunct manufacturing companies of Japan
Re-established companies
Manufacturing companies of Taiwan
1998 establishments in Taiwan
Manufacturing companies based in Philadelphia
2004 establishments in Pennsylvania
Cycling in Pennsylvania
Japanese brands
Japanese companies disestablished in 1998
Companies that filed for Chapter 11 bankruptcy in 2018